Palaeozygopleuridae is an extinct taxonomic family of fossil sea snails, marine gastropod molluscs.

This family has no subfamilies.

Genera 
Genera within the family Palaeozygopleuridae include:
 Palaeozygopleura Horný, 1955
 Palaeozygopleura chlupaci Frýda, 1993 - from early Lochkovian
 Palaeozygopleura vaneki Frýda, Ferrová, Berkyová & Frýdová, 2008
 subgenus Palaeozygopleura (Palaeozygopleura) Horný, 1955
 Palaeozygopleura alinae (Perner, 1907) - synonym: Zygopleura alinae Perner, 1907 - type species
 Palaeozygopleura vesna Horný, 1955
 subgenus Palaeozygopleura (Palaeozyga) Horný, 1955
 Palaeozygopleura bohemica Horný, 1955
 subgenus Palaeozygopleura (Bojozyga) Horný, 1955
 subgenus Palaeozygopleura (Bohemozyga) Frýda & Bandel, 1997
 Palaeozygopleura kettneri (Horný, 1955)
 subgenus Palaeozygopleura (Rhenozyga)
 Palaeozygopleura reifenstuhli Frýda & Blodgett, 2004
 Devonozyga Horný, 1955
 Pragozyga Frýda, 1999
 Pragozyga costata Frýda, 1999
 Medfrazyga Frýda & Blodgett, 2004 - from Silurian
 Medfrazyga clauticae Frýda & Blodgett, 2004

References